"When the Night Feels My Song" is a song by Canadian alternative rock group Bedouin Soundclash released in 2004 as the lead single from their debut album Sounding a Mosaic. It features a reggae/soft rock sound. 

When this song was first released in the UK in 2005, it reached number 24 in the charts. However, the song was later used as part of a T-Mobile advertising campaign and was re-released in October 2006. From 2007 to 2013, it was also used in the bumpers and credits of Kids' CBC, the children's block of CBC Television.

Music video
The music video shows the band on various streets during the night, in Toronto, Ontario, Canada. The streets were not closed for the video, so anyone seen in the video was not cast, and just happened to walk by during filming. The video reached #1 on the MuchMusic Countdown charts in November 2005, after entering the chart in September of that year.

"...Fills My Soul"
On the album, NME Presents The Essential Bands released in November 2005, the track was listed as "When the Night Fills My Soul". The song is still referred to by this name in some places. Officially, Bedouin's own website, band record sales and iTunes all refer to the track as "...Feels My Song". The NME apparent misprint appears to be the source of this misunderstanding.

Certifications

References

Songs about nights
Songs about music
2004 singles
2004 songs
Bedouin Soundclash songs